David Wayne Kimball (born January 13, 1982, in Fredericksburg, Virginia) is a former professional American football placekicker, most notably with the Frankfurt Galaxy of NFL Europe. He was allocated to NFL Europe by the Oakland Raiders in 2006. He attended State College Area High School and was a Parade All-American selection there in 1999. He resides in State College, Pennsylvania.

Penn State
Kimball played collegiately at Penn State University from 2000 to 2003, serving mostly as a kickoff specialist with 132 career touchbacks. While at Penn State, his major was Recreation & Park Management.

Professional 
Originally a seventh round selection (#229 overall) of the Indianapolis Colts in the 2004 NFL Draft, Kimball stood little chance making the squad over Mike Vanderjagt, the NFL's all-time most accurate field goal kicker. He was released by the Colts after training camp on September 1, 2004. He signed with the New York Giants on January 7, 2005, but was waived during camp on August 18, 2005, in favor of veteran kicker Jay Feely.

Kimball was signed as a free agent by the Oakland Raiders on January 19, 2006, and then allocated to the Frankfurt Galaxy on January 24. Kimball appeared in 1 preseason game with the Raiders, kicking a 23-yard field goal on his only attempt against the 49ers, before being cut on August 28, 2006.

In Europe, the Galaxy went 7–3 in the regular season on their way to the World Bowl. On May 27, 2006, Frankfurt defeated the Amsterdam Admirals 22–7 in World Bowl XIV. In the World Bowl, Kimball scored 8 points, going 2–2 on extra points and 2–3 on field goals. He made FG attempts from 29 & 37 yards, with his only miss coming on a 48-yard attempt that sailed wide left midway through the 2nd quarter. He had 5 kickoffs in the World Bowl, averaging 59.6 yards per kick. Kimball appeared in all 11 games (including the World Bowl) for the Galaxy, leading the team in scoring with 72 points. He was 18 for 18 on extra points, and 18 for 29 on field goal attempts. His longest kick of the season was 49 yards against the Rhein Fire. He kicked 2 game winning field goals, both with less than 10 seconds left in the 4th quarter. Kimball had 49 kickoffs for 3028 yards (61.8 average), with 2 touchbacks. He recorded 2 tackles during the season.

He now manages a consistently average fantasy football team named the Kareem Pies.

2006 Season Stats 
Frankfurt Galaxy

References

External links
David Kimball's NFL Europe bio
David Kimball's NFL.com bio

1982 births
Living people
Sportspeople from Fredericksburg, Virginia
Players of American football from Virginia
American football placekickers
Penn State Nittany Lions football players
Oakland Raiders players
Frankfurt Galaxy players
American expatriate sportspeople in Germany